1967 was the 68th season of County Championship cricket in England. India and Pakistan both toured England and played in three-match Test series. England defeated Pakistan 2–0 and India 3–0. Yorkshire retained the County Championship title.

Honours
County Championship – Yorkshire
Gillette Cup – Kent
Minor Counties Championship – Cheshire
Second XI Championship – Hampshire II 
Wisden – Asif Iqbal, Hanif Mohammad, Ken Higgs, Jim Parks, Nawab of Pataudi

Test series

India tour

Pakistan tour

England played two series in 1967 and were very successful, beating India 3–0 and Pakistan 2–0. Ken Barrington scored a century in each of the three matches against Pakistan.

County Championship

Gillette Cup

Leading batsmen
Ken Barrington topped the averages with 2059 runs at 68.63.

Leading bowlers
Derek Underwood topped the averages with 136 wickets at 12.39.

References

Annual reviews
 Playfair Cricket Annual 1968
 Wisden Cricketers' Almanack 1968

External links
 CricketArchive – season summary

1967 in English cricket
English cricket seasons in the 20th century